Beaver Dam High School may refer to:

Beaver Dam High School (Arizona), Beaver Dam, Arizona
Beaver Dam High School (Indiana), Akron, Indiana
Beaver Dam High School (Kentucky), Beaver Dam, Kentucky
Beaver Dam High School (Wisconsin), Beaver Dam, Wisconsin